Soltan-e Sahebgharan (also Romanized as Soltān-e Sāhebgherān) is an Iranian historical 1974 TV series directed by Ali Hatami. It stars Jamshid Mashayekhi, Naser Malek Motiee, Iren, Parviz Fanizadeh, Zari Khoshkam, Saeed Nikpour and Jahangir Forouhar. It deals with the Ghajar dynasty era and Nasereddin shah and Amir Kabir's relations and struggles and also assassination of the Shah by Mirza Reza Kermani.

Cast
Jamshid Mashayekhi ... Nasereddin Shah
Zari Khoshkam      ... Ezzatoddoleh
Naser Malek Motiee ... Amir Kabir
Irene Zazians      ... Mahd-e Olya
Parviz Fanizadeh   ... Malijak
Saeed Nikpour      ... Mirza Reza Kermani
Jahangir Forouhar  ... Mirza Aqa Khan-e Nuri

References

External links
Soltan-e Sahebgheran in IMDb

Iranian television series
1970s Iranian television series
1974 Iranian television series debuts